The Seven Banknotes is a 2019 Burmese thriller drama television series. It aired on MRTV-4, from July 18 to  August 14, 2019, on Mondays to Fridays at 19:00 for 20 episodes.

Cast

Main
Hein Htet as Aung Wai
Nan Sandar Hla Htun as Tha Ra Phi
Mya Hnin Yee Lwin as Wai Hnin Phyu
 Thi Ha as Deputy Sheriff Thura Htun

Supporting
Zin Wine as U Min Khant
 Ye Aung as U Kyaw Khaung
 Aung Khant Mue as Lwin Min
 Ju Jue Kay as Jue Jue
 Nay Yee as Pearl

References

Burmese television series
MRTV (TV network) original programming